The Maharashtra Forest Department is a department of the Indian state of Maharashtra responsible for forestry and wildlife management.

The headquarters of Maharashtra Forest Department is in Nagpur. There are 11 territorial forest circles in Amravati, Aurangabad, Chandrapur, Dhule, Gadchiroli, Kolhapur, Nagpur, Nashik, Pune, Thane and Yavatmal. The three wildlife circles are Wildlife Borivali, Wildlife Nagpur and Wildlife Nashik. The office of the Principal Chief Conservator of Forests, Head of Forest Force (HoFF) is the chief of the forest division in Maharashtra. Rights of tribal people in the forest areas under Forest Rights Act are also governed by the Forest Department.

33 Crore Tree Plantation Drive
To fight climate change and droughts in Maharashtra, the forest department planned 33 crore tree plantation drive. It was three-month long tree plantation drive across 36 districts from 1 July to 30 September in the State of Maharastra. The State over achieved the target by planting more than 33 Crore saplings. In total, Maharashtra Forest Department planted, 52 crore trees between 2017 and 2019 and the survival rate remains to be 81%.

References

External links
Official Website of the Maharashtra Forest Department, Government of Maharashtra

Government of Maharashtra
State forest departments of India
Wildlife conservation in India
Year of establishment missing